Edmund Charles Rawlings JP (11 December 1854 – 17 December 1917), was a British solicitor, a Liberal Party politician, and a prominent Primitive Methodist. He served as mayor of Hammersmith.

Family
Rawlings was born on 11 December 1854 at Wallingford, Oxfordshire to parents Edmund Rawlings (a Primitive Methodist minister) and Susannah Cock. He moved to London aged 14, becoming a solicitor in 1879 and forming a partnership in the City of London at Walbrook with Mr S Alford Butt (also the son of a Primitive Methodist minister). He married Amy Yates (1857-1914) in 1879 at Wilton, Wiltshire, and they had three children. He died on 17 December 1917 in Ealing.

Political career
In October 1900 Rawlings contested the UK General Election as Liberal candidate for  Islington North.

In November 1900 he was elected a Hammersmith Borough Councillor at Hammersmith's first borough council elections. He was later appointed an Alderman of the borough council. He also served as Mayor of Hammersmith from 1906-07.

He stood several times for election to the London County Council as a Progressive candidate, without success.  In 1895 and 1901 he contested Hammersmith. In 1910 he contested the City of London.
 
Rawlings took an active part in the relief of the unemployed and assistance of cripples. He also served as a Justice of the Peace for the County of London.

Electoral record

Religious activities
Rawlings was prominently involved with the Primitive Methodist movement, serving as vice-president and addressing its June 1905 conference in Scarborough. He wrote two PM publications: the Free Churchman's Legal Handbook, and (with a Dr Townsend) the Free Churchman’s Guide to the Education Act of 1902.

References

1854 births
1917 deaths
Liberal Party (UK) parliamentary candidates
Progressive Party (London) politicians